The Yanzi chunqiu ("Yanzi Annals" or "Annals of Master Yan") is an ancient Chinese text dating to the Warring States period (475221) that contains a collection of stories, speeches, and remonstrations attributed to Yan Ying, a famous official from the State of Qi who served Duke Jing of Qi (r. 547489).  It comprises 215 stories arranged into eight chapters: the first six chapters contain accounts of Yan Ying's remonstrations with the rulers he served, while the seventh chapter contains variants on stories from the first six chapters, and the eighth chapter has anti-Confucian episodes that the Han dynasty imperial librarian Liu Xiangwho compiled the received version of the Yanzi chunqiu in the late 1st centuryconsidered to be inconsistent with the Chinese Classics. The Yanzi chunqiu incorporates themes from both Confucianism and Mohism, and does not fit easily into any single philosophical tradition.

History
The first mention of the Yanzi chunqiu in a received work appears in the 62nd chapter of the ancient historian Sima Qian's late 2nd century work Records of the Grand Historian (Shiji 史記), the first of China's 24 dynastic histories.  Sima states that many scholars of his generation had copies of the text, but does not mention any author for it.  Contemporary sources indicate that, like many Chinese texts, the Yanzi chunqiu anciently circulated in a variety of different versions and collections.  In the late 1st century, the Han dynasty imperial librarian Liu Xiang edited thirty total Yanzi chunqiu chapters down to the eight chapters that compose the modern received text.

In 1972, a large cache of bamboo slip writings known as the Yinqueshan Han slips were discovered in a Han dynasty tomb near Linyi, Shandong Province.  Among the slips, which date to the early 2nd century, were 18 stories from the Yanzi chunqiu, thus confirming historical accounts of the Yanzi chunqiu'''s early existence.

Content
The Yanzi chunqiu comprises 215 stories arranged into eight chapters. The first six "inner" chapters contain accounts of Yan Ying's remonstrations with the rulers he served, and the seventh chapter contains variants on stories from the first six chapters, while the eighth chapter has anti-Confucian episodes that Liu Xiang considered to be inconsistent with the Chinese Classics.

Themes
The Yanzi chunqiu has proven difficult to classify into one single philosophical tradition, and much of the traditional Chinese scholarship on it has focused on its classification.  The bibliographical catalogs of the early dynastic histories list it as a Confucian ("Ruist") work, but in the early 8th century the poet and scholar Liu Zongyuan strongly argued that the Yanzi was actually a Mohist work, given its numerous references to such hallmark Mohist terms as "universal/impartial caring" (jiān'ài ), "opposition to music" (fēi yuè ), and "frugality" (jié yòng ).  Liu recognized that Yan Ying could not have been a follower of Mozi, which would be anachronistic, but believed that the Yanzi was written later by one of Mozi's followers who was familiar with the traditions of the State of Qi.  Liu's view that the Yanzi was a Mohist work was echoed by many subsequent Chinese scholars. Zhang Chunyi (18711955), one of the leading Mohism experts of the modern era, described the Yanzi as "60 to 70% Mohist and 30 to 40% Confucian."

Commentaries
In the late Qing Dynasty, Su Yu and Zhang Chunyi wrote Yanzi chunqiu jiaozhu, and in modern times, Wu Zeyu wrote Yanzi chunqiu jishi.

Translations
The first complete Western-language translation of the Yanzi chunqiu was published in 2016, and only a few English translations exist.
Milburn, Olivia, trans. (2016), The Spring and Autumn Annals of Master Yan, Leiden: Brill.
 Ariel, Yoav (2018), The Spring and Autumn Annals of Master Yan, A bilingual edition in 2 vols, Beijing: Renmin University Press.

The following contain partial translations:
 Kao, George (1946), Chinese Wit and Humor, pp. 37–46; reprinted in 1974 by Sterling Publishing Company.
  Lippe, Aschwin (1961), "Drei Geschichte aus dem 'Frühling und Herbst des Yen Ying'" ("Three Stories from the 'Spring and Autumn of Yan Ying'"), in Studia Sino-Altaica, Festschrift für Erich Haenisch.
 Watson, Burton (1962), Early Chinese Literature, New York: Columbia University Press, p. 186.
  Holzer, Rainer (1983), Yen-tzu und das Yen-tzu ch’un-ch’iu, Frankfurt: Peter Lang, 1983.

In contrast to the dearth of Western translations, at least five Japanese translations have been published. The two most commonly used Japanese translations are:
 Yamada, Taku , trans. (1969), Anshi shunjū 晏子春秋 ("Yanzi chunqiu"), Tokyo: Meitoku shuppansha.
 Yanaka, Shin'ichi , trans. (2000–01), Anshi shunjū'' 晏子春秋 ("Yanzi chunqiu"), 2 vols., Tokyo: Meiji shoin.

References

Citations

Bibliography

 
 

Zhou dynasty texts
Qi (state)
Chinese classic texts
3rd-century BC books